Anne Piquereau (born 15 June 1964 in Niort) is a retired French track and field athlete who specialised in the high hurdles. She won the bronze medal at the 1985 World Indoor Games (later renamed World Indoor Championships) and three medals at European Indoor Championships. In addition, she represented her country at the 1988 Olympic Games and  1992 Olympic Games, as well as at three outdoor World Championships, most notably finishing fifth in 1987.

She has personal bests of 12.74 seconds in the 100 metres hurdles (Saint-Denis 1991) and 7.88 seconds in the indoor 60 metres hurdles (Bordeaux 1990).

Competition record

National Championships
  Champion of France at 100m hurdles in 1988, 1992 and 1994
  Champion of France Indoors at 60m hurdles in 1985, 1986, 1987 and 1990

References

 
 
 

1964 births
Living people
French female hurdlers
Athletes (track and field) at the 1988 Summer Olympics
Athletes (track and field) at the 1992 Summer Olympics
Olympic athletes of France
People from Niort
World Athletics Championships athletes for France
Universiade medalists in athletics (track and field)
Athletes (track and field) at the 1991 Mediterranean Games
Mediterranean Games gold medalists for France
Sportspeople from Deux-Sèvres
Mediterranean Games medalists in athletics
Universiade bronze medalists for France
World Athletics Indoor Championships medalists
Competitors at the 1987 Summer Universiade
Medalists at the 1985 Summer Universiade
Competitors at the 1983 Summer Universiade